Tensions between the multinational technology company Google and its workers escalated in 2018 and 2019 as staff protested company decisions on a censored search engine for China, a military drone artificial intelligence, and internal sexual harassment.

Background 

Alphabet, the parent company of the multinational technology company Google, has over 100,000 full-time employees internationally, in addition to contract employees. About half of Google's total workers are contractors, known internally as "TVCs": temps, vendors, and contractors. Google has seen a rise in worker activism since 2018, with a swiftly changing internal culture in which staff have been alienated by scandals including a 2017 memo about Google's culture and diversity policies, revelation of a large exit package offered to an executive accused of sexual harassment, and staff accusations of retaliation. Under the company's "third era"—in which Google contends with the effects of having brought its technology to scale—The Verge wrote that the foremost task of Google CEO Sundar Pichai is to stabilize the company's culture.

Walkout 

A 20,000-employee walkout against Google executive sexual misconduct in November 2018 led to the company board opening an investigation. The walkout hastened organizing and protests within the company. Subsequent worker activism over work with the Pentagon and a censored Chinese search engine often entered the media spotlight. An engineer started a strike fund, matched by her own donation.

By mid-2019, Google appeared to push employee organizers to leave. Walkout organizers said that they were put on administrative leave for opaque reasons. In April, walkout organizers Meredith Whittaker and Claire Stapleton wrote that they were being demoted or reassigned as retaliation for their organizing. Stapleton left Google in June and Whittaker in July. In response, some employees participated in a sit-in and demanded that Google investigate its HR department. The company denied the allegations but instituted new policies against employee protest and in-office politics, which further eroded worker trust from parts of its staff. A September settlement with the National Labor Relations Board in response to Stapleton and Whittaker's departures required policy clarifications that explicitly let employees act collectively and discuss workplace issues with each other and the press. The settlement did not reduce tensions, which re-escalated in November when The New York Times reported that Google had been working for several months with IRI Consultants, a firm known for promoting union busting.

The "Thanksgiving Four" 

In November 2019, Google fired and suspended workers for media leaks and misuse of internal data, which some internal sources described as retaliation against activist staff. A publicized, 200-worker demonstration in San Francisco protested the suspension of Rebecca Rivers and Laurence Berland as unjust and demanded their reinstatement. Rivers had protested the U.S. Customs and Border Protection's (CBP) business with a Google cloud product, whereas Berland had protested YouTube's use of hate speech policy in relation to gay rights. Both Rivers and Berland spoke about their personal experiences at the rally, emphasizing the opaqueness behind being put on leave, particularly that they had not been told what they did wrong. Rivers said that the leave was about investigating her document access, but was questioned mostly in relation to her activism over Google's government contracts. Berland learned his own leave status through a news report. 

Following the rally, Google fired Rivers, Berland, and two rally participants, known together as the Thanksgiving Four, based on the firings' proximity to the holiday. A Google memo attributed the dismissals to security breaches, "accessing and distributing business information outside the scope of their jobs", and explained their action as a "rare" case. Internal activists described the recently changed access policy as vague and emphasized that viewing documents outside the scope of one's job was routine as part of Google's culture of openness and emphasized within the company's recruiting. Walkout organizers publicly accused Google of union busting through firing organizers, among other actions. Employer retaliation for collective action is prohibited under American federal law. 

CNBC described the Thanksgiving Four firings as virally amplifying their critics' platform, turning them into overnight "heroes", and leading other employees to share stories of being targeted for activism. The public nature of the protests, with individual stories and identities attached, inspired other employees to participate. Google organizers that had since left Google continued their support online. CNBC wrote that Google harmed itself with its unspecific public response, which obscured the legitimacy of the firings and let critics circulate their own conclusions, namely that staff were being fired for organizing. These dismissals underscored the outsized role of internal dissent and the company's perplexed approach to it. The Verge wrote that dissent within Google was a result of societal grappling with how to handle a company with Google's power, and that the company's antagonistic handling of its most politically active employees was considered the biggest failure of CEO Pichai's tenure. 

Around the same time, the company curtailed its weekly town hall meetings in response to leaks, reducing their frequency and narrowing their focus from general management questions to product and business strategy. The "TGIF" meetings had been a prominent component of Google's corporate culture of transparency. While the company had long taken action on leaks, journalists described the company's November actions as a "crackdown". Internal activists cited other recent policy changes in their accusation of company retaliation against collective action: employee guidelines on political speech, web browser history trackers, anti-union consultants, and a calendar tool to track events with over 100 participants. Court documents later showed that the company ran a program codenamed Project Vivian during this period to engage workers and convince them against supporting unions.

Unions 

In early December 2019, the Communications Workers of America union filed a federal labor complaint against Google for the November Four firings, opening a National Labor Relations Board investigation for Berland, Rivers, Paul Duke, and Sophie Waldman. The complaint argues that the company violated the National Labor Relations Act of 1935 and cites Google's code of conduct, which says, "don't be evil, and if you see something that you think isn't right—speak up!" The union also filed a complaint on behalf of Kathryn Spiers, an employee who said she was fired for building a reminder about worker protections in an internal HR guideline/policy reminder tool maintained by her team. Google said Spiers was fired not for the content of her message but for using a security and privacy tool for an unrelated purpose, and without business justification or team authorization. Spiers said that she received the appropriate approvals and her team lead confirmed that as the "owner" of that tool, Spiers did not need authorization to make such changes. The National Labor Relations Board returned a formal complaint against Google in December 2020 with the allegation of company interference in protected organizing activity.

Google's Bay Area cafeteria workers, contracted through the multinational foodservice company Compass Group, voted to unionize in late 2019. These 2,300 workers who prepare food and wash dishes are organizing with the union Unite Here, which is negotiating a contract with Compass Group. The cafeteria workers compose one of the largest bargaining units at an individual tech company and, according to Recode, demonstrated the growing strength of the tech labor movement. 90% of food-service staff for Google are unionized as of 2022.

A group of 225 Google engineers and workers went public as the Alphabet Workers Union, named after Google's parent company, in early January 2021. As a minority union unable to negotiate contracts without a majority vote of the company's 160,000 full-time employees and contractors, the group mainly exists to structure activism at Google. The Alphabet Workers Union is associated with the CODE Communication Workers of America and had been organizing for about a year.

An August 2022 petition organized by the union and signed by hundreds of Google employees sought abortion rights protections, both for Google search users and for the company's contingent labor.

See also 

 Amazon worker organization
 IBM worker organization
 Tech Workers Coalition

References

Further reading 

 
 
 
 
 
 
 
 
 
 
 
 
 
 
 
 
 
 
 
 
 
 
 
 
 
 
 
 
 
 
 
 
 
 
 
 
 

Articles containing video clips
worker organization

Labor relations in the United States
Tech sector trade unions
Google